XHLAR-TDT is a television station in Nuevo Laredo, Tamaulipas, Mexico. It is owned by Grupo Televisa and carries its Las Estrellas network. The station's studios and transmitter are located on Avenida de la República in Nuevo Laredo.

History

On March 9, 1994, Radiotelevisora de México Norte, S.A. de C.V., a subsidiary of Televisa, was authorized to build 62 new stations, including channel 57 in Nuevo Laredo, with the call sign XHNUL-TV. XHNUL and sister XHRTA-TV in Reynosa, however, did not sign on with Mexican programming.

Instead, channel 57 signed on for the first time on September 4 of that same year as XHFTX-TV, broadcasting programming from the Fox network for Laredo. Prior to XHFTX's sign-on, Laredo viewers received their Fox programs on cable, either from the national Foxnet service or from KRRT.

In 2002, XHFTX, along with XHFOX in Reynosa, disaffiliated from Fox, with the station changing its call sign to XHLAR-TV; Fox programming was reportedly replaced on cable with KABB. It would be about five years before Laredo would get another local Fox affiliate, KXOF-CA. XHLAR then became Televisa Nuevo Laredo, carrying local programming as well as re-airs of programs from the other Televisa networks, including series from Canal 5 and live sports from Gala TV.

Beginning in February 2013, XHLAR started broadcasting in digital on channel 38.1 (virtual 57.1); it started broadcasting in 1080i HD in March 2014.

In 2018, the concessions of all Las Estrellas stations were consolidated in the concessionaire Televimex, S.A. de C.V., as part of a corporate reorganization of Televisa's concessionaires.

Digital services
XHLAR broadcasts in 1080i HD on virtual channel 2.1. In December 2016, XHLAR was authorized to move from physical channel 38 to 29. It was allowed to begin utilizing virtual channel 2, putting the station in line with the rest of the network, in August 2018.

References

External links
XHLAR website 

Spanish-language television stations in Mexico
HLAR-TDT
Las Estrellas transmitters
Television channels and stations established in 1994